The Lead City Grays was the moniker of the professional minor league baseball team based in Lead, South Dakota in 1891 and 1892. The Lead City Grays played two seasons as members of the Independent level Black Hills League.

History
In 1891, the Lead City Grays became charter members when the Black Hills League began minor league play as a four–team Independent league, with franchises based in both Nebraska and South Dakota. The other 1891 Black Hills League charter franchises were the teams from Chadron, Nebraska, Deadwood, South Dakota (Deadwood Metropolitans) and Hot Springs, South Dakota. The 1891 team records and Black Hills League standings are unknown.

The Lead City Grays continued play as same four teams returned to play in the 1892 season. The 1892 season was the final season for the minor league Black Hills League. John Tierney managed the 1892 Grays. The 1892 league remained an Independent League and the circuit permanently folded following the 1892 season. Lead City and the other host cities have not hosted minor league baseball since the Black Hills League folded. Alex Beam and Robert Pender played for Lead City in 1892.

The overall team records, standings and statistics from the 1891 and 1892 Black Hills League seasons are unknown.

After the demise of the minor league, a semi–pro league played under the same name for many seasons, through at least the 1950s. Lead fielded teams in the circuit.

The ballpark
The exact name and location of the Lead City Grays' home ballpark in Lead, South Dakota is not directly referenced. In the era, Washington Park was in use. Today, Washington Park is still in use ad a public park. It is located on Washington Street, Lead, South Dakota.

Timeline

Year-by-year standings
The team records and standings from the 1891 and 1892 Black Hill League seasons are unknown.

Notable alumni
Alex Beam (1892)
Robert Pender (1892)

See also
 Lead City Grays players

References

External links
 Baseball Reference

Defunct baseball teams in South Dakota
Professional baseball teams in South Dakota
Baseball teams established in 1891
Baseball teams disestablished in 1892
Black Hills League teams
Lawrence County, South Dakota